Compton Aloysius Gonsalves (11 December 1926 – 8 March 2012) was a Trinidadian cyclist. He competed in the time trial and the sprint events at the 1948 Summer Olympics.

References

External links
 

1926 births
2012 deaths
Trinidad and Tobago male cyclists
Olympic cyclists of Trinidad and Tobago
Cyclists at the 1948 Summer Olympics
Competitors at the 1946 Central American and Caribbean Games
Competitors at the 1950 Central American and Caribbean Games
Central American and Caribbean Games silver medalists for Trinidad and Tobago
Central American and Caribbean Games bronze medalists for Trinidad and Tobago
British Guiana people
Sportspeople from Georgetown, Guyana
Central American and Caribbean Games medalists in cycling
20th-century Trinidad and Tobago people